Sisense is a business intelligence software company headquartered in New York City. It also has offices in San Francisco, Scottsdale, and elsewhere.

History 
Sisense was founded in 2004 in Tel Aviv, Israel, as a provider of business intelligence tools for small to midsize businesses. The company initially focused on research and development and did not formally publicize its products until 2010. Initial investors included venture capital firms Genesis Partners and Opus Capital and private investor Eli Farkash.

By 2012, Sisense had raised $10 million and expanded its operations to the United States. That same year, Amit Bendov was appointed as the company's CEO. Series B and C financing followed in 2013 and 2014, respectively, at which point Sisense had raised $44 million. TechCrunch noted that Sisense's growth and funding during this period reflected the degree to which it made big data analytics accessible to ordinary business users. By 2014, the company had opened an office in New York, and nearly 70 percent of its sales were in the U.S. to clients including eBay, ESPN, and Target.

In 2015, Amir Orad was appointed CEO, replacing Bendov. Orad previously served as CEO of NICE Actimize. Series C and D funding followed in 2016 and 2018, respectively, bringing Sisense’s total funding to $174M over five rounds. 

In May 2019, Sisense acquired Periscope Data, a U.S.-based company specializing in advanced analytics and predictive modeling. The combined company represented more than $100 million in annual recurring revenue, over 2,000 customers, and more than 700 employees. With another round of funding in January 2020, Sisense reached a valuation exceeding $1 billion, often referred to as unicorn status.

In February 2021, Sisense was listed as a “visionary” on the Gartner Magic Quadrant for analytics and business intelligence platforms. It was the fourth time the company had been featured on the list.

Technology 
The company develops business intelligence software that allows users to access and analyze big data. 

The company's analytics suite, Sisense Fusion, uses artificial intelligence and machine learning to analyze data. The platform allows users to customize their analytics dashboards and data visualization by industry and by a user's role within a business, respectively. The software can also alert users to anomalous results. 

In 2019, the company acquired data science software company Periscope Data, and renamed its software Sisense for Cloud Data Teams.

As of 2021, the software platform integrates with platforms such as Adobe Analytics, AWS, Microsoft Azure Synapse Analytics, and Snowflake to provide users with the data input for analysis.

See also
Science and technology in Israel

References

External links 

Business intelligence companies
Data analysis software
Business software
Companies based in Tel Aviv
Companies based in New York City
Software companies of Israel